Masjidi Hazrati Abu Bakr Siddique is a mosque in Flushing, Queens, New York, United States. It is located at 141-47 33rd Avenue.

Masjid Hazrati Abu Bakr Siddique is a nonprofit 501(c) organization, a community of believers adhering to Islam, the Qur’an and the life traditions of Muhammad. Masjidi Hazrati Abu Bakr Siddique was established by Afghan, Turkistani, and Uzbek immigrants from Afghanistan in 1986 as a community center for religious events and programs. The Mosque, Al-Masjid in Arabic, is the Muslim gathering place for prayer. Al-Masjid simply means “place of prostration.”

The mosque came to national attention when it was revealed that it had been regularly attended by Najibullah Zazi, Mohammed Wali Zazi, and imam Ahmad Wais Afzali, all three charged with issues related to terrorism.

See also
 List of mosques in the Americas
 Lists of mosques
 List of mosques in the United States

References

External links

Afghan-American culture
Central Asian American culture in New York (state)
Flushing, Queens
Mosques in New York City
Religious buildings and structures in Queens, New York
Mosque buildings with domes
Turkmenistan diaspora
Uzbekistani-American culture